The Ontario Southland Railway Inc. is an independently held short line operator. The company was founded in 1992 to purchase  of track between Tillsonburg and Ingersoll, Ontario from the Canadian Pacific Railway. In 2015, Ontario Southland began leasing the ex-Canadian National Cayuga Subdivision between St. Thomas and Delhi, Ontario, which had been abandoned by its former shortline operator the St. Thomas and Eastern Railway in 2013. The OSR also operated the Guelph Junction Railway until August 28th, 2020, when they ran their last train on the line before transferring operations to the Goderich and Exeter Railway.

Operations

Tillsonburg Operations
OSR's Tillsonburg Division operates on the remaining  of the ex-Canadian Pacific Port Burwell Subdivision between Ingersoll and Tillsonburg, Ontario. Customers served include Future Transfer, Cedar Crest Wood Products, Kissner Group, Johnson Controls, International Beams, and Wellmaster. Traffic destined for Growmark Inc. in Delhi, Ontario, as well as Cargill and Norfolk Co-Op in Courtland, Ontario is also handled.

St. Thomas Operations
Customers served include Ontario Refrigerated Services, Auto Warehousing Company, Agrium, Belmont Farm Supply, Sylvite, Messenger Freight Services, and Factor Gas Liquids. Interchange with CN at St. Thomas and with CP at Woodstock.

CAMI Automotive Operations
OSR does all switching at the CAMI Automotive plant in Ingersoll, Ontario. Approximately 100 multis are switched in and out of the facility each day.

Cayuga Subdivision

In November 2015, the OSR and Canadian National Railways announced that the OSR would be overtaking operation of CN's abandoned Cayuga subdivision from St. Thomas to Tillsonburg and further on to Delhi, Ontario, once necessary track maintenance was completed, in order to service a windmill turbine factory which had opened east of Tillsonburg. Other customers served include two grain elevators in Courtland, Ontario, an ethanol plant in Aylmer, Ontario and a fertilizer plant in Delhi.

Locomotive Roster

See also

 List of Ontario railways
 Rail transport in Ontario

References 

Ontario railways
Rail transport in Oxford County, Ontario
Rail transport in Woodstock, Ontario
Rail transport in Elgin County
Rail transport in St. Thomas, Ontario